James Richard O'Connor (April 20, 1930 – November 12, 2017) was an American political economist and professor of sociology. He was born April 20, 1930 in Boston, Massachusetts and died November 12, 2017 in Santa Cruz, California. He bore two sons in his life; Steven and Daniel OConnor.  

 Natural Causes: Essays in Ecological Marxism (Guilford Press, 1998).

References

External links
 Photographs of James (Jim) R. O'Connor from the UC Santa Cruz Library's Digital Collections

1930 births
2017 deaths
American economists
Ecosocialists
Political economists
Political ecologists
University of California, Santa Cruz faculty